German Gutierrez may refer to:

 Germán Andrés Gutiérrez (born 1990), Colombian footballer
 Germán Gutiérrez Cueto (1883-1975), Mexican  painter, sculptor, puppet designer and puppeteer
 Germán Cardona Gutiérrez (born 1956), the current Minister of Transport of Colombia
 German Gutierrez, television director of Insectia
 German Gutiérrez de Piñeres, the head coach of Alianza F.C. in 2002
 Germán Ojeda Gutiérrez, Sporting de Gijón president 1998-1999